Pornogrind (also known as porngrind or pornogore) is a musical microgenre offshoot of goregrind that lyrically deals with sexual and pornographic themes, hence the name.

Characteristics
The genre is related to, and similar to, goregrind, but minor differences from goregrind include pornogrind having simpler, slower, and more rock-like songs as well as the genre's pornographic theme present in lyrics and album artwork, which "would keep them out of most stores." Zero Tolerance described pornogrind as "the most downright perverted of the lot, often adding a dollop of filthy groove and vocals straight from the toilet." Natalie Purcell, however, in her book Death Metal Music: The Passion and Politics of a Subculture, suggests that pornogrind is defined solely on the basis of its lyrical content and unique imagery, its focus on pornographic content. Rolling Stone has said that it's "basically just grindcore, but with an over-the-top, juvenile obsession with sex, violence and the ways the two could combine on a woman’s body. Think samples from porno movies, lyrics about sexual violence and gross-out album art."

Notable bands of the genre include Gut and Cock and Ball Torture.

Controversy 
Pornogrind saw some limited mainstream media attention after the 2019 Dayton shooting when it came to light that the perpetrator, Connor Betts, performed live vocals in the pornogrind group Menstrual Munchies on multiple occasions. After the attack, artists, performers and avid fans of the genre were outraged after outlets such as Vice attempted linking pornogrind's obscene themes to the gunsman's motives. While pornogrind artists made it very clear that they do not approve of real life violence or Betts' actions, there were nevertheless a handful of pornogrind musicians who deleted their social media profiles, put their bands on a hiatus or outright quit the genre after the attack occurred.

See also
 Goregrind
 Grindcore

References

Grindcore
Death metal
Hardcore punk genres
Heavy metal genres
American rock music genres